Teal Swan (born Mary Teal Bosworth; June 16, 1984) is an American author who writes primarily on spiritual topics. A number of publications, including Eonline, The Guardian and the BBC noted that some of Swan’s teaching methods on how to manage mental health issues had been found controversial by her critics, which Swan and her supporters deny. Swan and her teachings are the subject of documentaries and podcasts.

Early life 
Swan was born in Santa Fe, New Mexico on June 16, 1984 and was raised in Logan, Utah. Swan has described interactions with the mental health profession in childhood. In her early childhood, Swan received therapy from Barbara Snow.

Career 
In 2011 she released the book The Sculptor in the Sky. In Summer 2011, she held her first event at a Salt Lake City recital hall, speaking to about twenty people.

In 2015, Swan was mentioned in a post by Cleveland-area columnist Regina Brett.

Her teaching methods sometimes guide participants to envision their own deaths, occasionally by suicide. In 2019, Lebo Diseko from BBC cited Swan's viewpoint on suicide:

"In the video Swan urges those who are feeling suicidal to seek medical help, but goes on to say that in her experience, for some people, this may not help long-term. She instead suggests that suicide be seen as "our safety net or our re-set button that's always available to us". She argues that viewing it in this way enables people to set the idea aside, and instead concentrate on what they can do to make themselves feel better in the present."

In October 2020, Swan's first novel, Hunger of the Pine, was published.

Documentaries
Swan was the subject of the 2017 documentary film Open Shadow: The Story of Teal Swan.

In 2018, a Gizmodo podcast, The Gateway, ran a six-part series on Teal Swan and her self-help spiritual teachings on depression and how her techniques "process past trauma in order to overcome it." The host, Jennings Brown, stated that Swan was not like a regular spiritual leader in terms both of her appearance and how she markets herself. , her YouTube videos had been viewed 55 million times.

In May 2022, Freeform released a four-part docu-series on Swan called The Deep End. The producers of the documentary followed Swan for three years, detailing the rules placed on her inner circle, and insinuating controlling and manipulative behavior. Swan disputes her characterization in the documentary, citing deceptive practices by the filmmakers. As Los Angeles Times states: "Since the program’s release, Swan has said the filmmakers bamboozled her and manipulated the footage, sharing a petition urging the director to release the unedited footage."

Personal life
Teal Swan has one son.

Bibliography

References

External links

1984 births
Living people
People from Santa Fe, New Mexico
American spiritual writers
American spiritual teachers
American women novelists
New Age spiritual leaders
21st-century American novelists
People from Logan, Utah
Satanic ritual abuse hysteria in the United States